Khwajgan, also known as Khwaja Khel,(خواجه خېل) is a clan or family of Yusufzai Pashtuns Khwajgan settled in different parts of Swat valley Pakistan, i.e. in Bara Bandai, Mingora, Barikot, Charbagh and Dakorak. Khwajgan is the title for "the Masters" or "learned people". Khwajgan, as the plural for "Khwāja", is often used to refer to a network of Sufis in Central Asia from the 10th to the 16th century. In Firdowsi's Shahnama the word is used many times for some rulers and heroes of ancient Iran as well. Khwajgan or Khwaja Khel of Swat valley are those who follow Pashtunwali, a non-written ethical code.

Settlements

In the 16th century after the migration of Yusufzai from Kabul and the conquest of Swat by Yusufzai. In 18th century, Khwajgan were settled in a village of Kabal Tehsil named Tall Dardiyal and took the profession of business into their hands. With the passage of time, Khwajakhel was relocated to Pir Kaley Matta in the relocation system of Swat State.
After some years they were again relocated to Bara Bandai Dakorak, Charbagh with the same system, and lands were allotted to the family in the village they settled.

Recent settlement
The first known people of the Khwajgan family at Swat were Fazal Ahmad Shah and Habib Shah. Fazal Ahmad Shah had three sons Sayyaden Shah, Nawab Shah, and Muhammad Shah who are now descended to almost eight generations. In the 20th century, after the urbanization of The Yusafzai State of Swat due to their business needs, Khwajgan settled in different towns and cities of Swat. Mostly in Bara Bandai, Mingora, Sangota, Charbagh and Barikot.

See also
 Pashtun
 Pashtun tribes
 Yusufzai
  Afghan

Bibliography 
 Masters Of Wisdom: An Esoteric History of the Spiritual Unfolding of Life on This Planet by J.G. Bennett, 
 Masters Of Wisdom of Central Asia by Hasan Shusud, 
 The Teachers of Gurdjieff by Rafael Lefort, 
 The Naqshbandi Sufi Way, History and Guidebook of the Saints of the Golden Chain by Shaykh Muhammad Hisham Kabbani, Kazi Publications, USA (1995),

References

External links 
 Online Copy of a short version of Shushud's Masters of Wisdom, translated by J. G. Bennett and published in Systematics
 The Riddle of Balkh, the Elevated Candle
 Gurdjieff and Sufism

Yusufzai Pashtun tribes